Melicope simplex is a shrub in the family Rutaceae that is native to New Zealand.

References

simplex
Endemic flora of New Zealand